The Inyan Kara Group is a geologic group classification applied in South Dakota and adopted in portions of Wyoming and Montana. It preserves fossils of the mid-Cretaceous period. Of late Albian age, this classification correlates with the lower Dakota Formation (Nishnabotna member) known in the southwest corner of the State. 

The South Dakota Geological Survey has also extended the Graneros to group other formations into a unit that correlates with the upper Dakota Formation (Note: This definition is widely different than the generally consistent definitions of Graneros/Belle Fourche.). These state definitions of the Inyan Kara and Graneros Groups thereby cover the first two sequences of the Western Interior Seaway recorded by the Dakota Formation. 

North Dakota also classifies the same strata as Inyan Kara, but only of formation rank without recognizing further formal subdivision, and assigns this Inyan Kara Formation as the lowest member of the Dakota Group.

See also

 List of fossiliferous stratigraphic units in South Dakota
 Paleontology in South Dakota

References

Geologic groups of South Dakota
Cretaceous System of North America